Container Bob was the nickname given to Amir Farid Rizk who was found in a shipping container in Italy in October 2001, apparently attempting to travel from Egypt to Canada.

His container was equipped with a bed, toilet, heater, food and water, a laptop, cell phones and a satellite phone. He was found when workers in the Italian port of Gioia Tauro heard strange noises coming from his container. The container ship had left Egypt five days earlier and was bound for Canada. 
 
Forty-three-year-old Rizk was born in Egypt and had been a Canadian citizen for almost 20 years. He was carrying a valid Canadian passport that he had obtained in Cairo in August. He also carried a confirmed airline ticket for travel from Rome to Montreal (where he had family), as well as an aircraft mechanic certificate and security passes for airports in Canada, Thailand and Egypt. According to Italian prosecutors he had studied in Egypt and North America to become an airline mechanic.

Shortly after the events of September 11, 2001, Rizk's story raised fears of a terrorist connection. 
Rizk was arrested on terrorism charges and interviewed. He was released on 15 November 2001.

According to his lawyer, he chose the container because he believed a hostile brother-in-law was attempting to prevent his departure from Egypt.

References

2001 in Italy
Shipping containers
Stowaways
Living people
Year of birth missing (living people)
2001 crimes in Italy